Elifuraha Ndesamburo Urio Marealle (died 16 October 2015) was a Tanganyikan politician. In 1955 she was one of the first three women appointed to the Legislative Council.

Biography
Marealle attended Ashira Girls School in Moshi, and later taught at the school. In September 1948 she married Thomas Marealle, paramount chief of the Chaga people.

In 1955 she was appointed to the Legislative Council as one of the first three female members, the only African amongst the three. In the same year she was a delegate to the Marangu conference of the Lutheran Church as a representative of the Evangelical Lutheran Church of Tanganyika, where she was a keynote speaker. She became a member of the YWCA in the 1960s and worked at TANESCO.

She died in October 2015 after several years of illness.

References

Date of birth unknown
Tanzanian schoolteachers
20th-century Tanzanian women politicians
Members of the Legislative Council of Tanganyika
2015 deaths